Gandhi Krishi Vigyana Kendra (GKVK), is one of the campus and administrative headquarters of UAS (University of Agricultural Sciences, Bangalore). It is located in Bangalore Suburb Yelahanka, Karnataka, India.

Events at the Campus

Krishi Mela
Krishi Mela is an annual event in the campus. It showcases latest agricultural technologies for the benefit of farmers. The mela includes stalls from various research institutes, seeds companies, farm machinery manufacturers in India as well as stalls show casing techniques of organic farming  and produces.

External links
Gandhi Krishi Vigyana Kendra
List of Krishi vigyan kendras in Karnataka

References

Universities and colleges in Bangalore